Khan Jan Khani (also Romanized as Khān Jān Khānī) is a village in Dehpir-e Shomali Rural District, in the Central District of Khorramabad County, Lorestan Province, Iran. At the 2006 census, its population was 512, in 105 families.

References 

Towns and villages in Khorramabad County